Wronowo may refer to the following places:
Wronowo, Greater Poland Voivodeship (west-central Poland)
Wronowo, Masovian Voivodeship (east-central Poland)
Wronowo, Podlaskie Voivodeship (north-east Poland)